In basketball, a turnover occurs when a team loses possession of the ball to the opposing team before a player takes a shot at their team's basket. This can result from a player getting the ball stolen, stepping out of bounds, having a pass intercepted, committing a violation (such as double dribble, traveling, shot clock violation, three-second violation or five-second violation), or committing an offensive foul (including personal, flagrant, and technical fouls).

According to Boston Globe sportswriter Bob Ryan, the concept of the turnover was first formulated by his colleague Jack Barry. Turnovers were first officially recorded in the American Basketball Association (ABA) during the 1967–68 season, and this practice was later adopted by the NBA during the 1977–78 season subsequent to the NBA-ABA merger.

Records
The record for the most turnovers in an NBA game is shared by Jason Kidd and John Drew. Kidd committed 14 turnovers against the New York Knicks on November 17, 2000 while playing for the Phoenix Suns. Drew committed 14 turnovers against the New Jersey Nets on March 1, 1978 while playing for the Atlanta Hawks. The record for most turnovers in an NBA playoff game was 13, set by James Harden on May 27, 2015 while playing for the Houston Rockets against the Golden State Warriors. The WNBA has recorded turnovers since its inaugural season in 1997. The record for the most turnovers by a WNBA team in one game is 33. The record for the most turnovers by a WNBA player per season is held by Ticha Penicheiro, who committed 135 turnovers in 1999. The career record for the most turnovers by a WNBA player is held by Sue Bird has the most turnovers in the WNBA with 1,370.

See also
List of National Basketball Association career turnovers leaders

References

Basketball terminology
Basketball statistics